Jennifer Flay is the director of the Fiac (Foire Internationale d'Art Contemporain).

Early life 
Flay was born in Auckland in 1959. She came to France in 1980 to study art history at the University of Nice.

Career 
Flay opened a gallery in 1991 in the Marais district, rue Debelleyme. She has represented the artists Richard Billingham, Claude Closky, Melanie Counsell, John Currin, Willie Doherty, Felix Gonzalez-Torres, Dominique Gonzalez-Foerster, Karen Kilimnik, Sean Landers, Liz Larner, Lisa Milroy, Rei Naito, Xavier Veilhan among others. In 1997 she moves her gallery to the 13th art district rue Louise-Weiss in Paris.

She was appointed Artistic Director of the Fiac in 2003. In 2010 she is named General Director of the art fair.

In 2022 she has curated the first exhibition at the Fiminco Foundation in Romainville. The exhibition named De toi à moi brings together the work of ten young artists based in France: Elsa Werth, Myriam Mihindou, Tirdad Hashemi and Soufia Erfanian, Neila Czermak Ichti, Mégane Brauer and Bianca Bondi.

Honours 
 Legion of honour Officer (2015)
 Ordre des Arts et des Lettres Commander (2020)

References 

Living people
1959 births
People from Auckland
French art dealers

Officiers of the Légion d'honneur
Officiers of the Ordre des Arts et des Lettres
21st-century French women